Dilip Chhabria is an Indian car designer and the founder of DC Design. He designed and manufactured the DC Avanti, which is considered India's first sports car. In 2020, he was arrested for running a car scam.

Biography

Dilip Chhabria graduated with a bachelor's degree in commerce. In a 2015 interview, he said that he had seen an advertisement in a car magazine and decided to become a car designer. He then studied in the Art Center College of Design in Pasadena, US.

After graduating, he worked for General Motors. He returned to India to start a workshop in Marol. His first product was a ring shaped horn for the Premier Padmini.

In 2002, he was hired by the Kinetic Engineering Limited to design a limited edition scooter. In 2003 he designed a prototype for Aston Martin Vantage. In 2004 he designed a car for the film Taarzan: The Wonder Car. In 2006, he tied up with Exim Star of ETA Star Group to form a new company, DCStar. It was set up in Dubai to produce custom cars. In 2009, he designed a concept car for the Coca-Cola Company to promote the energy drink Burn in India. In 2011, he designed the REVA NXR electric car for Mahindra & Mahindra. In 2012, Air Works India tied up with Chhabria to design airplane interiors. In 2013, he was hired by Siddhi Vinayak Logistics to design the buses for their luxury bus service. In 2014, he designed custom luxury buses for Girikand Logistics. In 2015, he launched the DC Avanti.

In 2010, he launched the DYPDC Center for Automotive Research and Studies with the D. Y. Patil group.

Car scam 
On 29 December 2020, Chhabria was arrested for running a car scam. On 7 January 2021, comedian Kapil Sharma filed an FIR against Chhabria for cheating him.

See also
 DYPDC Center for Automotive Research and Studies
 DC Avanti

References

Further reading

External links
 DC Design

Automobile designers
20th-century Indian designers
Art Center College of Design alumni